Events in the year 1899 in Norway.

Incumbents
 Monarch – Oscar II
Prime Minister – Johannes Steen

Events
1 April – The Norwegian Confederation of Trade Unions is established.  
27 June – The paperclip is patented by Johan Vaaler, a Norwegian inventor.
13 October – The Røvær accident: A storm kills 30 people at sea near Haugesund.
14 October – The Titran accident: A storm kills 141 fishermen at sea near Frøya, Trøndelag.
Grans Brewery is founded.

Popular culture

Sports
5 March – The sports club Korsvoll IL is founded.
10 August – Viking FK football club is founded.
The sports club Kongsberg IF is founded.
The gymnastics club Volda TI is founded.

Music

Theatre
25 August – First performance at the theatre academy Sekondteatret
1 September – First performance at the newly constructed National Theatre in Kristiania

Literature
The newspaper Rogalands Avis established
The newspaper Finnmarken established

Notable births

25 January – Peder Holt, politician (died 1963)
25 January – Rolf Jacobsen, boxer (died 1960)
3 February – Olaf Aarvold, priest and politician (died 1991)
12 February – Johan Grøttumsbråten, skier and multiple Olympic gold medallist (died 1983)
15 February – Mikal Grøvan, politician (died 1956)
14 March – Kjell Tellander, politician (died 1968)
17 March – Søren Berg Sørensen Moen, politician (died 1946)
26 March – Ragnvald Mikal Andersen, politician (died 1995)
8 April – Arthur Sundt, politician (died 1971)
27 April – Erling Johannes Norvik, politician (died 1964)
1 July – Haakon Olsen Wika, politician (died 1981)
17 July – Johannes Overå, fisheries administrator (died 1989). 
23 July – Johan Trandem, shot putter and discus thrower (died 1996)
25 July – Olav Svendsen, jurist.
6 August – Lillebil Ibsen, dancer and actress (died 1989)
6 August – Torstein Børte, politician (died 1985)
6 August – Finn Nagell, military officer, Milorg pioneer, economist and businessperson (died 1977).
8 August – Olav Sundal, gymnast and Olympic silver medallist (died 1978)
17 August – Torolv Kandahl, politician (died 1982)
23 August – Terje Wold, judge, politician and Minister (died 1972)
25 August – Karl Aas, gymnast and Olympic silver medallist (died 1943)
27 August – Per Hagen, politician (died 1983)
13 September – Magnus Bjorndal, Norwegian American engineer (died 1971)
22 September – Emil Løvlien, forest worker, trade unionist and politician (died 1973)
30 September – Henry Larsen, Arctic explorer in Canada (died 1964)
7 October – Øystein Ore, mathematician (died 1968)
23 October – Bernt Balchen, polar and aviation pioneer in America (died 1973)
24 October – Einar Hareide, politician (died 1983)
1 November – Anne Grimdalen, sculptor (died 1961)
7 November – Bjarne Fjærtoft, politician (died 1981)
12 November – Sverre Hansen, long jumper and Olympic bronze medallist (died 1991)
24 November – Petter Jamvold, sailor and Olympic gold medallist (died 1961)
27 November – Knut Hergel, actor and theatre director (died 1982)
18 December – Peter Wessel Zapffe, author and philosopher (died 1990)
30 December – Helge Ingstad, explorer (died 2001)

Full date unknown
Nils Hønsvald, politician and Minister (died 1971)
Jonas Lie, politician and Minister, collaborator (died 1945)
Egil Offenberg, politician and Minister (died 1975)
Jakob Martin Pettersen, politician and Minister (died 1970)
Knut Robberstad, jurist and philologist (died 1981)
Arne Torkildsen, neurosurgeon (died 1968)

Notable deaths

2 February – Halfdan Egedius, painter and illustrator (born 1877)
18 February – Sophus Lie, mathematician (born 1842)
5 June – Magnus Feilberg, bookseller and publisher (born 1817)
11 June – Jakob Sverdrup, bishop and politician (born 1845)
4 September – Jacob Dybwad, bookseller and publisher (born 1823).
8 December – Johan Christian Tandberg Castberg, newspaper founder and editor and politician (born 1827)

Full date unknown
Olav Jakobsen Høyem, teacher, telegrapher, supervisor of banknote printing and linguist (born 1830)
Lauritz Jenssen, businessperson and politician (born 1837)
Oluf Rygh, archeologist, philologist and historian (born 1833)
Christian Homann Schweigaard, politician and Prime Minister (born 1838)

See also

References